= Krishna Kamini Dasi =

Bengali poet

Krishna Kamini Dasi was an Indian writer in Bengali language, who authored Chitto Bilasini (1856).
